Halfway There may refer to:

 "Halfway There", a song by Big Time Rush from BTR, 2010
 "Halfway There", a song by Greg Page from his debut album, 1998
 "Halfway There", a song by Mike Rutherford from Acting Very Strange, 1982
 "Halfway There", a song by Rozes, 2019
 "Halfway There", a song by Soundgarden from King Animal, 2012
 "Halfway There" (Tiësto and Dzeko song), 2019

See also
 Half Way There, a 2019 album by Busted